The BMW i8 is a plug-in hybrid sports car developed by BMW. The i8 was part of BMW's electrified fleet and was marketed under the BMW i sub-brand. The production version of the BMW i8 was unveiled at the 2013 Frankfurt Motor Show and was released in Germany in June 2014. Deliveries to retail customers in the U.S. began in August 2014. A roadster variant was launched in May 2018. Production ended in June 2020.

The 2015 model year i8 had a 7.1-kWh lithium-ion battery pack that delivered an all-electric range of  under the New European Driving Cycle.

The BMW i8 coupé had a fuel efficiency of  under the NEDC test with carbon emissions of 49 g/km. The EPA rated the i8 combined fuel economy at 76 MPGe (3.1 L gasoline-equivalent/100 km; 91 mpg-imp gasoline-equivalent) and 29 miles per gallon (6.7L/100 km) when running in pure gasoline mode.

By March 2020, global sales of all variants had reached more than 20,000 units, making the BMW i8 the world's top-selling plug-in electric sports car, and exceeding sales of all competitors in its segment combined.

History

First introduced as the Concept Vision EfficientDynamics, the i8 was part of BMW's "Project i" and was marketed as a new brand, BMW i, sold separately from BMW or Mini. The BMW i3, launched for customers in Europe in the fourth quarter of 2013, was the first model of the i brand available in the market, and it was followed by the i8, released in Germany in June 2014 as a 2015 model year. Other i models were expected to follow.

The initial turbodiesel concept car was unveiled at the 2009 International Motor Show Germany, In 2010, BMW announced the mass production of the Vision EfficientDynamics concept in Leipzig beginning in 2013 as the BMW i8. The BMW i8 gasoline-powered concept car destined for production was unveiled at the 2011 Frankfurt Motor Show. The production version of the BMW i8 was unveiled at the 2013 International Motor Show Germany. The following are the concept and pre-production models developed by BMW that preceded the production version. When BMW i sponsored the ABB FIA Formula E World Championship, they announced that they would provide support vehicles; the i8 operated as the official safety car.

BMW Vision EfficientDynamics (2009)

BMW Vision EfficientDynamics concept car was a plug-in hybrid with a 1.5L three-cylinder turbo-diesel engine.

The lightweight chassis was made mainly from aluminum. The windshield, top, doors, and fenders were made from polycarbonate glass, with the body having a drag coefficient of 0.22.

The designers of the BMW Vision EfficientDynamics concept were Mario Majdandzic for the exterior and Jochen Paesen (lead interior design), Markus Speck (interior design), and Felix Staudacher former Baerlin (detail design) for the interior. While Jochen Paesen took care of the main interior theme, Markus Speck was in charge of the seats, all the visible structure, and some details. Felix Baerlin supported Jochen Paesen on details including the steering wheel and center console.

The vehicle was unveiled at the 2009 International Motor Show Germany, followed by Auto China 2010.

BMW i8 Concept (2011)

All four wheels provided regenerative braking. The location of the battery pack in the energy tunnel gave the vehicle a low centre of gravity, enhancing its dynamics. Under normal driving conditions the i8 was expected to deliver  under the European cycle. A full charge of the battery would take less than two hours at 220 V. The positioning of the motor and engine over the axles resulted in 50/50 weight distribution.

The vehicle was unveiled at the 2011 International Motor Show Germany, followed by CENTER 548 in New York City, 42nd Tokyo Motor Show 2011, 82nd Geneva Motor Show 2012, BMW i Born Electric Tour at the Palazzo Delle Esposizioni at Via Nazionale 194 in Rome, and Auto Shanghai 2013.

This concept car was featured in the film Mission: Impossible – Ghost Protocol.

BMW i8 Concept Spyder (2012)

The BMW i8 Concept Spyder included a slightly shorter wheelbase and overall length compared to the BMW i8 Concept, carbon-fiber-reinforced plastic (CFRP) Life module, drive modules made primarily from aluminum components, interlocking of surfaces and lines,  screen display, off-white outer layer, and orange-toned naturally tanned leather upholstery.

The vehicle was unveiled at Auto China 2012 in Beijing where it won Concept Car of the Year, followed by the 83rd Geneva International Motor Show 2013. The designer of the BMW i8 Concept Spyder was Richard Kim.

BMW i8 coupe prototype (2013)
The design of the BMW i8 coupe prototype was based on the BMW i8 Concept. The BMW i8 prototype had an average fuel efficiency of less than  under the New European Driving Cycle with carbon emissions of less than 59 g/km. The i8 with its carbon-fiber-reinforced plastic (CFRP) passenger cell lightweight, aerodynamically optimized body, and BMW eDrive technology offered the dynamic performance of a sports car, with an expected  sprint time of less than 4.5 seconds using both power sources.

The BMW i8's second power source was a hybrid synchronous electric motor specially developed and produced by the BMW Group for BMW i. Typical of an electric motor, responsive power was instantly available when starting and this continued into the higher load ranges. As well as providing a power boost to assist the gasoline engine during acceleration, the electric motor could also power the vehicle by itself. Linear acceleration was maintained even at higher speeds since the interplay between the two power sources efficiently absorbed any power flow interruptions when shifting gears. The model-specific version of the high-voltage 7.2 lithium-ion battery had a liquid cooling system and could be recharged at a conventional household power socket, at a BMW I Wallbox, or at a public charging station. In the US, a full recharge took approximately 3.5 hours from a conventional 120 V, 12 amp household circuit or approximately 1.5 hours from a 240 V Level 2 charger.

The driver could select several driving modes: SPORT, COMFORT, and ECO PRO. Using the gear selector, the driver could either select position D for automated gear selection or could switch to SPORT mode. SPORT mode offered manual gear selection and at the same time switched to sporty drive and suspension settings. In SPORT mode, the engine and electric motor delivered extra performance, accelerator response was faster, and the power boost from the electric motor was maximized. And to keep the battery topped up, SPORT mode also activated maximum energy recuperation during overrun and braking as the electric motor's generator function, which recharged the battery using kinetic energy, switched to a more powerful setting. The Driving Experience Control switch on the center console offered a choice of two settings. On starting, COMFORT mode was activated, which offered a balance between performance and fuel efficiency, with unrestricted access to all convenience functions. Alternatively, the ECO PRO mode could be engaged, which, on the BMW i8 as on other models, supported an efficiency-optimized driving style. In this mode, the powertrain controller coordinated the cooperation between the gasoline engine and the electric motor for maximum fuel economy. On deceleration, the intelligent energy management system automatically decided, in line with the driving situation and vehicle status, whether to recuperate braking energy or to coast with the powertrain disengaged. At the same time, ECO PRO mode also programmed electrical convenience functions such as the air conditioning, seat heating, and heated mirrors to operate at minimum power consumption, but without compromising safety. The BMW i8's ECO PRO mode could also be used during all-electric operation. The vehicle was then powered solely by the electric motor. Only if the battery charge dropped below a given level, or under sudden intense throttle application such as kick down, was the internal combustion engine automatically activated.

The vehicle was unveiled in BMW Group's Miramas test track in France.

Production version

The production BMW i8 was designed by Benoit Jacob. The production version was unveiled at the 2013 International Motor Show Germany, followed by 2013 Les Voiles de Saint-Tropez. Its design was heavily influenced by the BMW M1 Homage concept car, which in turn pays homage to BMW's last production mid-engined sports car prior to the i8: the BMW M1.

The BMW i8 featured butterfly doors, head-up display, rear-view cameras and partially false engine noise. Series production of customer vehicles began in April 2014. The electric two-speed drivetrain was developed and produced by GKN. It was the first production car with laser headlights, reaching farther than LED lights.

The 20,000th i8 was produced in December 2019, one of the limited Ultimate Sophisto Edition models. The last i8 rolled off the production line on 11 June 2020. In total, there were 20,465 units produced: 16,581 coupés and 3,884 roadsters.

Range and fuel economy

The production i8 had a 7.1 kWh lithium-ion battery pack with a usable capacity of 5.2 kWh and intelligent energy management that delivered an all-electric range of  under the NEDC cycle.

The production version had a fuel efficiency of  under the NEDC test with carbon emissions of 49 g/km. Under EPA cycle, the i8 combined fuel economy in EV mode was rated 76 equivalent (MPG-equivalent) (3.1 L gasoline equivalent/100 km; 91 mpg-imp gasoline equivalent), with an energy consumption of 43 kW-hrs/100 mi and gasoline consumption of 0.1 gal-US/100 mi.

The U.S. Environmental Protection Agency's 2014 edition of the Light-Duty Automotive Technology, Carbon Dioxide Emissions, and Fuel Economy Trends introduced utility factors for plug-in hybrids to represent the percentage of miles that would be driven using electricity by an average driver, in electric only or blended modes. The BMW i8 Coupé had an EV mode utility factor of 37%, compared with 83% for the BMW i3 REx, 66% for the Chevrolet Volt, 65% for the Cadillac ELR, 45% for the Ford Energi models, 43% for the McLaren P1, 39% for the Porsche Panamera S E-Hybrid, and 29% for the Toyota Prius PHV.

The battery capacity of both models launched in 2018, BMW i8 Roadster and the i8 Coupé, was increased to a gross energy content of 11.6 kWh.

The following are the BMW i8 U.S. Environmental Protection Agency (EPA) ratings for all-electric range and fuel economy for all variants of the i8 between 2014 and 2020 model years.

Engines

Special edition

The special-edition BMW i8 Protonic Red Edition model was unveiled at the 2016 Geneva International Motor Show. The Protonic Red Edition was produced at BMW Plant Leipzig from July 2016. This special edition car sported a Protonic Red paint finish with accents in Frozen Grey metallic. The colour scheme was complemented by BMW W-spoke 470 light-alloy wheels painted in Orbit Grey metallic with hubs painted in Aluminium matte and mixed-size tires (front: 215/45 R20, rear: 245/40 R20). Inside, the car featured red double-stitching and applications in high-grade carbon fibre and ceramic trim.

Roadster 

The BMW i8 Spyder concept was unveiled at the 2012 Beijing Auto Show. In October 2016, BMW announced that the roadster variant would be added to the BMW i line-up in 2018. The production version of the BMW i8 Roadster was premiered in late 2017, and delivery of the first 18 exclusive first edition units took place in May 2018.

The battery cell capacity of both models, coupé and roadster, was increased from 20 to 34 Ah and a gross energy content of 11.6 kWh. At the same time, optimized battery cell technology made it possible to increase the peak output of the electric motor by 9 kW/12 hp to 105 kW/143 hp. The BMW i8 Roadster had only two seats, and the roof was an electric two-piece unit, which neatly folded into space where the rear seats would normally be.

Sales and markets

BMW originally planned to sell the i8 in about 50 countries, with the U.S. expected to be the largest sales market. In Europe, BMW expected the UK, Germany and France to be the top markets.

Global deliveries to retail customers totaled 1,741 units in 2014, and 5,456 in 2015, totaling cumulative sales of 7,197 units worldwide through December 2015. In 2015, global sales of the BMW i8 exceeded the combined figure of all other hybrid sports cars produced by other manufacturers. Global cumulative sales reached more than 10,000 BMW i8s by early November 2016, representing 10% of BMW's global electrified model sales. By March 2020, worldwide sales since inception totaled more than 20,000 units, making the i8 the world's top selling plug-in electric sports cars, and exceeding sales of all competitors in its segment combined.

Australia

Deliveries in Australia for the i8 commenced in March 2015, priced at $299,000 AUD. 155 units of the i8 were sold in Australia by the end of its production. Unlike international sales process where the i3 and i8 were sold at dedicated BMW i Stores, Australia had six dedicated dealers across the country that were authorised to sell the i8: BMW Melbourne (Southbank), BMW Sydney (Rushcutters Bay), Brisbane BMW (Fortitude Valley), Perth Auto Classic (Victoria Park), Adelaide BMW (South Australian Capital) and Rolfe Classic (Phillip, Australian Capital Territory).

Service and repair facilities for the BMW i8 were available at 11 authorized BMW dealers around Australia.

China
Initially, sales of the BMW i brand vehicles were limited to seven dealerships in Beijing, Shanghai, Shenzhen and Shenyang. BMW expected combined sales of around 1,000 units for its i3 and i8 models through December 2014.

India

BMW introduced four variants of i8 in the Indian market in February 2015. This was the costliest offering from BMW in the country, at a price of INR 2.29 crore (ex-showroom). The car was sold through exclusive BMW i dealerships established in the cities of Chennai, Delhi, and Mumbai.

Japan
On 14 November 2013, BMW announced they were taking orders for the i8 in Japan. Pricing started at ¥19,170,000 which included the 8% consumption tax.

Thailand

At the 2014 Bangkok International Motor Show, BMW announced that they were taking orders for the i8 in Thailand, priced at ฿11,839,000 THB and ฿12,389,000 THB, which included the 8% consumption tax. On 28 August 2018, BMW announced they were taking orders for the i8 Roadster, priced at ฿12,999,000 THB.

Europe

A total of 61 units were delivered in Europe in June 2014, its first month in the market.

European sales statistics are from the following countries: Austria, Belgium, Cyprus, Czech Republic, Denmark, Estonia, Finland, France, Germany, Great Britain, Greece, Hungary, Iceland, Ireland, Italy, Latvia, Lithuania, Luxembourg, Netherlands, Norway, Poland, Portugal, Romania, Slovakia, Slovenia, Spain, Sweden, Switzerland.

Spain
The i8 was available in Madrid starting in 2016.

Germany

, registrations totaled 986 units.

Switzerland

Deliveries began in June 2014, and a total of 64 units were registered in 2014. Cumulative sales reached 117 units through June 2015.

United Kingdom
The BMW i8 qualified for exemption from the London congestion charge, which was one of the factors driving its demand.

Two weeks after deliveries began, the i8 was sold out in the UK, and, by August 2014, there was a 10-month waiting list. By the end of February 2015, there was still a 9-month waiting list. A total of 1,307 units were registered by the end of June 2016. , about 1,700 i8s had been sold in the UK since mid-2014, making the British market the largest in Europe.

Mexico
The i8 was available in Mexico starting 2014 with a price tag of $2,299,900 MXN. On 30 August 2018, BMW announced they were taking orders for the i8 Roadster, priced at $3,199,900 MXN.

United States

First deliveries to retail customers in the U.S. took place at the 2014 Pebble Beach Concours d'Elegance on 15 August. In order to commemorate the i8's American launch, a 2014 BMW i8 Concours d'Elegance Edition was auctioned during Gooding & Company's annual Pebble Beach Auctions. This special edition car featured BMW Individual Frozen Grey Metallic exterior paint, Dalbergia Brown leather upholstery, trim accents in BMW i Blue, and other unique features. The proceedings went to the Pebble Beach Company Foundation.

Sales in 2015 reached 2,265 units, up 308% from 2014. A total of 6,776 units were sold through December 2019.

U.S. sales figures

Awards and recognition
In July 2012, the BMW i8 won the 2012 North American Concept Vehicle of the Year. The BMW i8 Spyder won the 2013 Best Production Preview Vehicle award. The i8 won AutoGuides 2015 Reader's Choice Green Car of the Year. BMW's i8 was the winner of the coveted title 'World Green car of the Year' at Fame India Eco Drive 2015. It also was selected as Autoblog's 2014 Technology of the Year. Top Gear Magazine awarded the i8 with their coveted Car of the Year award for 2014. Green Car Journal awarded the BMW i8 with its 2015 Luxury Green Car of the Year. The i8 won the UK Car of the Year 2015 and also UK Performance Car of the Year 2015. The World Car of the Year organization declared the i8 as the winner of the 2015 World Green Car Award.

Marketing
Louis Vuitton produced a series of carbon-black luggage for BMW i8, which included the Weekender GM i8, Garment Bag i8, Business Case i8, and Weekender PM i8. The luggage series went on sale in a selection of Louis Vuitton stores worldwide (Munich, Milan, London, Paris, Moscow, Dubai, New York, and Los Angeles) starting on 1 April 2014.

See also
 Acura NSX
 BMW ActiveE
 BMW i
 BMW i3 (BMW Mega City Vehicle)
 BMW XM
 Government incentives for plug-in electric vehicles
 Lexus LC
 List of modern production plug-in electric vehicles
 Mini E
 Plug-in electric vehicle
 Plug-in hybrid

References

External links

 BMW i8 official website
 Press kit: The BMW i8.
 2011 BMW i8 Concept
 2013 BMW i8 Spyder Concept
 2015 BMW i8
 BMWi NY window into near future
 Official final production version specifications
 Virtual tour BMW i8 interior 
 BMW i8 Rescue Guideline 

i8
i8
Electric sports cars
Plug-in hybrid vehicles
Cars introduced in 2014
Rear mid-engine, all-wheel-drive vehicles